Acari National Park is a national park in the state of Amazonas, Brazil.

Location

The Acari National Park covers parts of the municipalities of Apuí (11.77%), Borba (59.55%) and Novo Aripuanã (28.68%) in Amazonas.
It is north of the BR-230 Trans-Amazonian Highway in the Apuí – Jacareacanga section.
The Urupadi National Forest and the Alto Maués Ecological Station border the park to the east.
It is in the Amazon biome.

History

The Acari National Park was created by federal decree on 11 May 2016.
It is administered by the Chico Mendes Institute for Biodiversity Conservation (ICMBio).
The objective is to protect the biological diversity of the Acari, Camaiú, Sucunduri and Abacaxis rivers and their tributaries and the physical landscape, to ensure sustainability of the ecosystem services, to contribute to environmental stability in the region and to provide for development of recreational activities in contact with nature and ecotourism.

The park was one of five conservation units created in last week before the provisional removal of president Dilma Rousseff, totalling , all in the south of Amazonas state.

Her administration had also reduced the area of seven protected areas in the Amazon to allow for construction of dams on the Tapajós.

Notes

Sources

2016 establishments in Brazil
National parks of Brazil
Protected areas of Amazonas (Brazilian state)